Espen Edvardsen (born 25 February 1979) is a retired Norwegian football midfielder.

Joining Rosenborg BK's junior team in 1996, he was drafted into the first team ahead of the 1999 season. He was loaned out to Byåsen in 1999 and 2000 and Strømsgodset in 2001, and featured in Rosenborg league and cup matches in the summer of 1999. He was also capped as a Norway youth and U21 international. He was let go from Rosenborg after the 2001 season. Joining Byåsen on a permanent basis, he moved to Oslo in 2006 to play for St. Hanshaugens IF before that team folded in late 2007.

References

1979 births
Living people
Footballers from Trondheim
Norwegian footballers
Norway youth international footballers
Norway under-21 international footballers
Rosenborg BK players
Byåsen Toppfotball players
Strømsgodset Toppfotball players
Association football midfielders
Eliteserien players
Norwegian First Division players